Celia Weston is an American character actress. Weston received an Independent Spirit Award nomination for her performance in Dead Man Walking (1995), and also had supporting roles in more than 40 movies, including The Talented Mr. Ripley (1999), In the Bedroom (2001), Hulk (2003), and The Village (2004). On television, she is best known for her role as Jolene Hunnicutt in the CBS sitcom Alice (1981–85).

Career
Weston began her career on stage, making her Broadway debut in 1979. After a recurring role on the ABC daytime soap opera, Ryan's Hope, she  joined the cast of the CBS sitcom Alice as Jolene Hunnicutt until the series ended in 1985. Weston later said that her role in Alice hindered her film career. Although she had initially rejected the role, she admitted that "the money became so phenomenal that I just had to do it." In later years, Weston acted in independent films and stage productions. She was nominated for the Independent Spirit Award for Best Supporting Female for her role as Mary Beth Percy in the 1995 crime drama film, Dead Man Walking opposite Susan Sarandon. She also received her Tony Award nomination for her performance in the comedy The Last Night of Ballyhoo (1997).

Weston had many supporting roles in films during her career. In the 2000s she had guest starring roles on Law & Order: Special Victims Unit, Frasier and Desperate Housewives. From 2010 to 2011 she co-starred alongside Jason Lee and Alfre Woodard in the TNT comedy-drama, Memphis Beat. She later had recurring roles on Modern Family and American Horror Story: Freak Show.

Personal life
Weston was born in Spartanburg, South Carolina. She was born Celia Watson, but changed her professional name to Weston because a British actress was already using Celia Watson professionally. She attended high school at the Spartanburg Day School, graduating in 1966. She is a graduate of Salem College in Winston-Salem, North Carolina and the University of North Carolina School of the Arts.

Filmography

Film

Television

Theatre

References

External links
 
 
 
 
Celia Weston biography, as part of "Alice" cast member

Actresses from South Carolina
American film actresses
American stage actresses
American television actresses
Living people
People from Spartanburg, South Carolina
Salem College alumni
20th-century American actresses
21st-century American actresses
Year of birth missing (living people)